கண்டன்விளை [Kandanvilai] is a village in Kanyakumari District in the Indian state of Tamil Nadu.

History 
In 1935, Kandanvilai was attached to the Karankadu parish under the Diocese of Quilon. During this time Mr Packianathan donated his land to a Diocese and requested that a church be built in Kandanvilai [கண்டன்விளை]. The Bishop of the Diocese of Quilon, Most Rev Fr. Aloysius Maria Benziger OCD consented and together with the parish priest of Karankadu came down to Kandanvilai to select a site. The bishop, the priest and the people were overjoyed and confirmed the site for the Church. In Tamil, the vision was interpreted as "Kanavil Kanda Vilai."

Geography 
It is on the Nagercoil–Monday Nager Highway,  from Nagercoil.

Transport 
The nearest railway station is Erainel. The nearest airport is Trivandrum.

Religion 
Kandanvilai is home to the  St. Therese of Infant Jesus Church, the first church built for St. Therese of Lisieux after her Beatification on April 7, 1924.

Administration 
1.Village Administrative office
2. Nullivilai panchayat office

Education  

1. Govt Higher Secondary School
2. St. Therese Primary School 
3. Aldrin Matriculation School

Facilities  

1. State Bank of India, Kandanvilai
2. Indian Bank, Kandanvilai
3. Agricultural Cooperative Society, Kandanvilai
4. Post office, Kandanvilai

External links 
1. http://www.thereseofkandanvilai.info/index.html

2. http://iraiarasu.com/

3. http://azhagiyaboomi.org/

Villages in Kanyakumari district